Lembert Dome is a granite dome rock formation in Yosemite National Park in the US state of California. The landform is an example of a rôche moutonnée with clear lee and stoss slopes.

Lembert Dome was named for Jean Baptiste Lembert, sometimes mistakenly referred to as John Lambert, who took up a homestead in a section of Tuolumne Meadows in 1865. By 1879 the Wheeler Survey referred to it as Soda Springs Dome. John Muir called it Glacier Rock.

Lembert Dome is near Puppy Dome, is also close to Dog Dome.

Rock climbers can scale the face from the parking lot just off the Tioga Road, but hikers can simply walk up the back side or take the challenging steeper trek up the face starting from just east of the parking lot. Many technical free climbing routes have been put up.

References

External links

 

Granite domes of Yosemite National Park
Landforms of Tuolumne County, California
Tourist attractions in Tuolumne County, California
Hills of California
Rock formations of California